The Wooden Church is a church in Tusa, Sâg, Romania, built in the 18th century.

References

External links
 Tusa, Wooden church

Historic monuments in Sălaj County
18th-century Eastern Orthodox church buildings
Wooden churches in Sălaj County
18th-century churches in Romania